The Chairperson of the Sevastopol City State Administration (holova Sevastopolskoyi miskoyi derzhavnoyi administratsiyi) is the head of executive branch for the Sevastopol city. Informally it is referred to as Governor of Sevastopol. 

The office is an appointed position, with officeholders being appointed by the President of Ukraine on recommendation from the Prime Minister of Ukraine. According to the Ukrainian Constitution she/he should resign after a new President is elected. Due to the 2014 Russian aggression against Ukraine and Russian occupation of the Autonomous Republic of Crimea, it makes it impossible to appoint new state administration.

The official residence for the governor is located in Sevastopol. 

The post was created in 1992 as the Presidential representative in Sevastopol, and the first appointee was Ivan Yermakov who previously headed the city's council and its executive committee. Post of the Sevastopol city governor existed previously in the Russian Empire in1872–1920. During the Soviet period, the city was governed by the First Secretary of the city's committee of the Communist Party, which was dissolved in Ukraine due to the 1991 August putsch. Due to the 2014 Crimean crisis and annexation of Crimea, the post was abolished. The last appointed head of the Sevastopol City State Administration was Volodymyr Yatsuba, who resigned in 2014.

Governors

Executive committee chairperson
 1954–1957: Serhiy Sosnytskyi
 1957–1963: unknown
 1963–1973: Pavlo Stenkovyi
 1973–1979: Ivan Kyrylenko
 1979–1989: Yevgeniy Generalov
 1990–1991: Arkadiy Shestakov
 1991–1992: Ivan Yermakov

Presidential representative
 1992–1994: Ivan Yermakov
 1994: Mykola Hlushko (acting January–April)
 1994–1995: vacant

Administration chairperson
 1995–1998: Viktor Semenov
 1998–1999: Borys Kucher
 1999–2005: Leonid Zhunko
 2005–2006: Serhiy Ivanov
 2006–2010: Serhiy Kunitsyn
 2010–2011: Valeriy Saratov
 2011–2014: Volodymyr Yatsuba
2014: Fedir Rubanov

See also
 Sevastopol City Committee of the Communist Party of Ukraine
 Governor of Sevastopol (Russia)

References

External links
 World Statesmen.org

 
Sevastopol